Amata williami is a moth of the family Erebidae. It was described by Rothschild in 1910. It is found in Kenya.

References

 Natural History Museum Lepidoptera generic names catalog

Endemic moths of Kenya
williami
Moths described in 1910
Moths of Africa